This is a list of rivers in the U.S. state of Virginia.

By drainage basin
This list is arranged by drainage basin, with respective tributaries, arranged in the order of their confluence from mouth to source, indented under each larger stream's name.

Atlantic Ocean north of Chesapeake Bay
Cockle Creek
Machipongo River

Chesapeake Bay
Pocomoke River

Potomac River
Hull Creek
Coan River
Yeocomico River
Northwest Yeocomico River
South Yeocomico River
West Yeocomico River
Lower Machodoc Creek
Nomini Creek
Popes Creek
Mattox Creek
Rosier Creek
Upper Machodoc Creek
Potomac Creek
Accokeek Creek
Aquia Creek
Chopawamsic Creek
Quantico Creek
Neabsco Creek
Occoquan River
Bull Run
Popes Head Creek
Cub Run
Little Bull Run
Cedar Run
Broad Run
Kettle Run
Pohick Creek
Accotink Creek
Dogue Creek
Little Hunting Creek
Hunting Creek
Cameron Run
Holmes Run
Four Mile Run
Lubber Run
Pimmit Run
Difficult Run
Sugarland Run
Broad Run
Goose Creek
Little River
North Fork Goose Creek
Beaverdam Creek
Catoctin Creek
North Fork Catoctin Creek
South Fork Catoctin Creek
Shenandoah River 
North Fork Shenandoah River
Passage Creek
Cedar Creek
Stony Creek
Mill Creek
Smith Creek
Linville Creek
Shoemaker River
Little Dry River
German River
Cold Spring River
South Fork Shenandoah River
Hawksbill Creek
South River
Back Creek
North River
Middle River
Christians Creek
Naked Creek
Cooks Creek
Dry River
Muddy Creek
Beaver Creek
Briery Branch
Little River
Opequon Creek
Mill Creek
Abrams Creek
Red Bud Run
Back Creek
Hogue Creek
Isaacs Creek
Sleepy Creek
South Branch Potomac River
South Fork South Branch Potomac River
North Fork South Branch Potomac River
Laurel Fork
Little Wicomico River
Great Wicomico River

Rappahannock River
Urbanna Creek
Lagrange Creek
Parrotts Creek
Corrotoman River
Totuskey Creek
Piscataway Creek
Hoskins Creek
Cat Point Creek
Occupacia Creek
Rapidan River
Mine Run
Robinson River
Rose River
South River
Conway River
Staunton River
Mountain Run
Hazel River
Thornton River
Rush River
Covington River
Piney River
Hughes River
Jordan River
Piankatank River
Dragon Swamp
East River
North River
Ware River
Severn River

York River
Perrin River
Queen Creek
Poropotank River
Mattaponi River
Maracossic Creek
South River
Motto River
Matta River
Mat River
Ta River
Poni River
Po River
Ni River
Pamunkey River
South Anna River
Newfound River
Taylors Creek
North Anna River
Little River
Pamunkey Creek
Contrary Creek
Poquoson River
Back River
Harris River
Hampton Roads
Hampton River
Elizabeth River
Lafayette River
Western Branch Elizabeth River
Eastern Branch Elizabeth River
Indian River
Southern Branch Elizabeth River
James River 
Hoffler Creek
Nansemond River
Knotts Creek
Bennett Creek
Chuckatuck Creek
Brewers Creek
Pagan River
Warwick River
Lawnes Creek
Skiffes Creek
College Creek
Grays Creek
Chickahominy River
Diascund Creek
Upper Chippokes Creek
Wards Creek
Bailey Creek
Appomattox River
Cabin Creek
Swift Creek
Namozine Creek
Deep Creek
Flat Creek
Bush River
Sandy River
Buffalo Creek
Falling Creek
Powhite Creek
Deep Creek
Muddy Creek
Willis River
Little Willis River
Byrd Creek
Rivanna River
Mechunk Creek
Buck Island Creek
North Fork Rivanna River
Lynch River
Roach River
South Fork Rivanna River
Mechums River
Moormans River
Doyles River
Slate River
North River
Hardware River
Rockfish River
Tye River
Rucker Run
Buffalo River
Piney River
Little Piney River
South Fork Tye River
North Fork Tye River
David Creek
Beaver Creek
Blackwater Creek
Ivy Creek
Harris Creek
Pedlar River
Maury River
Buffalo Creek
North Buffalo Creek
South Buffalo Creek
South River
Irish Creek
Saint Marys River
Whistle Creek
Kerrs Creek
Hays Creek
Little Calfpasture River
Calfpasture River
Mill Creek (Calfpasture River tributary)
Cedar Creek (James River tributary)
Catawba Creek
Craig Creek
Johns Creek
Mill Creek (James River tributary)
Sinking Creek
Cowpasture River
Stuart Run
Bullpasture River
Jackson River
Potts Creek
Dunlap Creek
Ogle Creek (Virginia)
Cedar Creek (Jackson River tributary)
Back Creek
Little Back Creek
Lynnhaven River

Atlantic Ocean south of Chesapeake Bay
North Landing River
Pocaty River
Northwest River (Virginia)

Chowan River (NC)
Meherrin River
Fountains Creek
Flat Rock Creek
North Meherrin River
Reedy Creek
South Meherrin River
Middle Meherrin River
Somerton Creek
Blackwater River
Nottoway River
Mill Creek
Nottoway Swamp
Assamoosick Swamp
Three Creek
Raccoon Creek
Hunting Quarter Swamp
Rowanty Creek
Stony Creek
Sappony Creek
Sturgeon Creek
Waqua Creek
Tommeheton Creek
Crooked Creek
Little Nottoway River
Horsepen Creek
Jacks Branch
Whetstone Creek
Long Branch
Lazaretto Creek
Mallorys Creek
Carys Creek

Roanoke River (or Staunton River)
Allen Creek (Roanoke River tributary)
Island Creek
Grassy Creek
Bluestone Creek
Little Bluestone Creek
Dan River
Line Branch
Aarons Creek
North Fork
Big Branch
Perkins Branch
Big Mountain Branch
Mountain Branch
Wolfpit Run
Hyco River
Morris Branch
Flat Branch
Hilly Creek
Pensions Branch
Larkin Branch
Terrell Branch
Hudson Branch
Bluewing Creek
Halfway Creek
Dry Creek
Coleman Creek
Mayo Creek
Crutchfield Branch
Bowes Branch
Lick Branch
Banister River
Gibson Creek
Wolf Trap Creek
Myers Creek
Winn Creek
Toots Creek
Terrible Creek
Little Terrible Creek
Kents Creek
Polecat Creek
Little Polecat Creek
Sandy Creek
Johns Run
Lick Branch
Bar Branch
Pine Creek
Sweden Fork
Johns Run
Bye Creek
Bradley Creek
Runaway Creek
Elkhorn Creek
Brush Creek
Squirrel Creek
Allen Creek
Blacks Creek
Peters Creek
Bird Creek
Stinking River
Flyblow Creek
Dry Branch
Maggotty Creek
North Fork Stinking River
West Fork Stinking River
Shockoe Creek
Whitethorn Creek
Dry Branch
Georges Creek
Dry Branch
Mill Creek
Poplar Branch
Long Branch
Cherrystone Creek
Little Cherrystone Creek
Tanyard Branch
Green Rock Branch
Whites Branch
Roaring Fork
Pole Bridge Branch
White Oak Creek
Dry Fork
Pudding Creek
Tompkins Branch
Bearskin Creek
Lick Branch
Bolin Branch
Little Bearskin Creek
Hemp Fork
Strawberry Creek
Morris Branch
Robins Branch
Wet Sleeve Creek
Mitchell Branch
Chatman Branch
Grassy Creek
Perrin Creek
Reedy Creek
Poplar Creek
Pond Branch
Miry Creek
Lawsons Creek
Stokes Creek
Bowle Spring Branch
Jerimy Creek
Butrum Creek
Long Branch
Country Line Creek
Sandy River
Cascade Creek
Smith River
Leatherwood Creek
Mayo River
North Mayo River
South Mayo River
Russell Creek
Little Dan River
Browns Dan River
Difficult Creek
Roanoke Creek
Cub Creek
Falling River
Little Falling River
Mollys Creek
South Fork Falling River
Straightstone Creek
Seneca Creek
West Little Seneca Creek
East Little Seneca Creek
Otter River
Big Otter River
Little Otter River
Goose Creek (Roanoke River tributary)
Pigg River
Snow Creek
Big Chestnut Creek
Blackwater River
Maggodee Creek
Back Creek
Tinker Creek
North Fork Roanoke River
South Fork Roanoke River
Goose Creek (South Fork Roanoke River tributary)
Pee Dee River (NC)
Yadkin River (NC)
Ararat River
Stewarts Creek
Pauls Creek
Brushy Fork
Little Pauls Creek
Garners Creek
Stony Creek
Huntington Branch
Naked Run
Flat Creek
Turkey Creek
North Fork Stewarts Creek
South Fork Stewarts Creek
Lovills Creek
Halls Branch
Elk Spur Branch
Waterfall Branch
Johnson Creek
East Fork Johnson Creek
Clarks Creek
Double Spring Branch
Long Branch
Owens Branch
Doe Run Creek
Birds Branch
Dry Run
Grogen Branch
Kings Run
Sun Run
Thompson Creek
Fisher River
Gully Creek

Mississippi River

Tennessee River

Tennessee River (TN)
Clinch River
Powell River
Indian Creek
Martin Creek
Wallen Creek
North Fork Powell River
South Fork Powell River
North Fork Clinch River
Copper Creek
Stock Creek
Guest River
Big Creek
Little River
Holston River (TN)
North Fork Holston River
Possum Creek
Big Moccasin Creek
Laurel Creek (North Fork Holston River tributary)
South Fork Holston River
Beaver Creek
Middle Fork Holston River
Laurel Creek (South Fork Holston River tributary)
Whitetop Laurel Creek

Ohio River
Ohio River (KY, WV)
Big Sandy River (KY)
Levisa Fork
Russell Fork
Pound River
Cranes Nest River
McClure River
Home Creek
Slate Creek
Dismal Creek (tributary of Levisa Fork)
Tug Fork
Knox Creek
Dry Fork

Kanawha River (WV)
New River
Bluestone River
East River
Wolf Creek
Walker Creek
Little Walker Creek
Kimberling Creek
Sinking Creek
Little River (New River tributary)
Pine Creek (Floyd County, Virginia)
West Fork Little River
Peak Creek
Big Reed Island Creek
Cripple Creek
Crooked Creek
Beaverdam Creek
Glade Creek
Grassy Creek
Greasy Creek
Big Branch
Laurel Fork (Virginia)
Little Snake Creek
Bear Creek
Pine Creek
Pipestem Branch
Snake Creek
Sulphur Spring Branch
Stone Mountain Creek
Burks Fork
Little Reed Island Creek
Reed Creek
Chestnut Creek
Elk Creek
Little River (North Carolina–Virginia)
Fox Creek
Wilson Creek
North Fork New River
Helton Creek
Big Horse Creek

Alphabetically
Aarons Creek
Abrams Creek
Accokeek Creek
Accotink Creek
Allen Creek (Roanoke River tributary)
Appomattox River
Aquia Creek
Ararat River
Back Creek (Jackson River tributary)
Back Creek (Potomac River tributary)
Back Creek (Roanoke River tributary)
Back Creek (South River tributary)
Back River
Bailey Creek
Banister River
Beaver Creek (James River tributary)
Beaver Creek (North River tributary)
Beaver Creek (South Fork Holston River tributary)
Beaverdam Creek
Bennett Creek
Big Chestnut Creek
Big Creek
Big Horse Creek
Big Moccasin Creek
Big Otter River
Big Reed Island Creek
Birds Branch (Ararat River tributary)
Blackwater Creek
Blackwater River (Chowan River tributary)
Blackwater River (Roanoke River tributary)
Bluestone Creek
Bluestone River
Bluewing Creek
Bowes Branch
Brewers Creek
Briery Branch
Broad Run (Occoquan River tributary)
Broad Run (Potomac River tributary)
Browns Dan River
Buck Island Creek
Buffalo Creek (Appomattox River tributary)
Buffalo Creek (Maury River tributary)
Buffalo River
Bull Run
Bullpasture River
Burke Fork
Bush River
Byrd Creek
Cabin Creek
Cameron Run
Carys Creek (Little Nottoway River tributary)
Cascade Creek
Catawba Creek
Catoctin Creek
Calfpasture River
Cat Point Creek
Cedar Creek (Jackson River tributary)
Cedar Creek (James River tributary)
Cedar Creek (North Fork Shenandoah River tributary)
Cedar Run (Occoquan River tributary)
Chickahominy River
Chopawamsic Creek
Chestnut Creek
Christians Creek
Chuckatuck Creek
Clarks Creek (Ararat River tributary)
Clinch River
Coan River
Cockle Creek
Cold Spring River
Coleman Creek
College Creek
Conway River
Cooks Creek
Copper Creek
Corrotoman River
Country Line Creek
Covington River
Cowpasture River
Craig Creek
Cranes Nest River
Cripple Creek
Crooked Creek
Cub Creek
Cub Run
Dan River
David Creek
Deep Creek (Appomattox River tributary)
Deep Creek (James River tributary)
Diascund Creek
Difficult Creek
Difficult Run
Dismal Creek (tributary of Levisa Fork)
Doe Run Creek (Ararat River tributary)
Dogue Creek
Doyles River
Dreaming Creek
Dry Fork
Dry Creek
Dry River
Dunlap Creek
East Little Seneca Creek
East River (Giles County)
East River (Mathews County)
Eastern Branch Elizabeth River
Elizabeth River
Elk Creek
Falling Creek
Falling River
Fisher River
Flat Branch
Flat Creek
Flat Rock Creek
Fountains Creek
Four Mile Run
Fox Creek
German River
Goose Creek (Potomac River tributary)
Goose Creek (Roanoke River tributary)
Goose Creek (South Fork Roanoke River tributary)
Grassy Creek
Grays Creek
Great Wicomico River
Grogen Branch
Guest River
Halfway Creek
Hampton River
Hardware River
Harris Creek
Harris River
Hawksbill Creek
Hays Creek
Hazel River
Helton Creek
Hilly Creek
Hogue Creek
Home Creek
Horsepen Creek (Little Nottoway River tributary)
Hoskins Creek
Hudson Branch
Hughes River
Hull Creek
Hunting Creek
Hyco River
Indian Creek
Indian River
Irish Creek
Isaacs Creek
Island Creek
Ivy Creek
Jackson River
Jacks Branch (Little Nottoway River tributary)
James River
Johns Creek
Jordan River
Kerrs Creek
Kettle Run
Kimberling Creek
Kings Run (Ararat River tributary)
Knotts Creek
Knox Creek
Lafayette River
Lagrange Creek
Larkin Branch
Laurel Creek (North Fork Holston River tributary)
Laurel Creek (South Fork Holston River tributary)
Laurel Fork
Lawnes Creek
Lazaretto Creek (Little Nottoway River tributary)
Leatherwood Creek
Levisa Fork
Linville Creek
Little Back Creek
Little Bluestone Creek
Little Bull Run
Little Calfpasture River
Little Dan River
Little Dry River
Little Falling River
Little Hunting Creek
Little Nottoway River
Little Otter River
Little Piney River
Little Reed Island Creek
Little River (Clinch River tributary)
Little River (Goose Creek tributary)
Little River (New River tributary)
Little River (North Anna River tributary)
Little River (North Carolina–Virginia)
Little River (North River tributary)
Little Walker Creek
Little Wicomico River
Little Willis River
Long Branch (Little Nottoway River tributary)
Lovills Creek
Lower Machodoc Creek
Lynch River
Lynnhaven River
McClure River
Machipongo River
Maggodee Creek
Mallorys Creek (Little Nottoway River tributary)
Maracossic Creek
Martin Creek
Mat River
Matta River
Mattaponi River
Mattox Creek
Maury River
Mayo Creek
Mayo River
Mechums River
Mechunk Creek
Meherrin River
Middle Fork Holston River
Middle Meherrin River
Middle River
Mill Creek (Calfpasture River tributary)
Mill Creek (James River tributary)
Mill Creek (North Fork Shenandoah River tributary)
Mill Creek (Opequon Creek tributary)
Mine Run
Mollys Creek
Moormans River
Morris Branch
Mosquito Creek
Motto River
Mountain Run
Muddy Creek (Dry River tributary)
Muddy Creek (James River tributary)
Naked Creek
Namozine Creek
Nansemond River
Neabsco Creek
Tims River
New River
Newfound River
Ni River
Nomini Creek
North Anna River
North Buffalo Creek
North Fork Catoctin Creek
North Fork Clinch River
North Fork Goose Creek
North Fork Holston River
North Fork Powell River
North Fork Rivanna River
North Fork Roanoke River
North Fork Shenandoah River
North Fork Tye River
North Landing River
North Mayo River
North Meherrin River
North River (Mobjack Bay)
North River (Slate River tributary)
North River (South Fork Shenandoah River tributary)
Northwest River
Northwest Yeocomico River
Nottoway River
Occoquan River
Occupacia Creek
Ogle Creek (Virginia)
Opequon Creek
Owens Branch (Ararat River tributary)
Pagan River
Pamunkey Creek
Pamunkey River
Parrotts Creek
Passage Creek
Peak Creek
Pedlar River
Pensions Branch
Perrin River
Piankatank River
Pigg River
Pimmit Run
Piney River (Thornton River tributary)
Piney River (Tye River tributary)
Piscataway Creek
Po River
Pocaty River
Pocomoke River
Pohick Creek
Poni River
Popes Creek
Popes Head Creek
Poquoson River
Poropotank River
Possum Creek
Potomac Creek
Potomac River
Potts Creek
Pound River
Powell River
Powhite Creek
Quantico Creek
Queen Creek
Rapidan River
Rappahannock River
Red Bud Run
Reed Creek
Reed Island Creek
Reedy Creek
Rivanna River
Roach River
Roanoke Creek
Roanoke River (or Staunton River)
Robinson River
Rockfish River
Rose River
Rosier Creek
Rowanty Creek
Rucker Run
Rush River
Russell Creek
Russell Fork
Saint Marys River
Sandy Creek
Sandy River (Bush River tributary)
Sandy River (Dan River tributary)
Sappony Creek
Seneca Creek
Severn River
Shenandoah River
Shoemaker River
Sinking Creek (James River tributary)
Sinking Creek (New River tributary)
Skiffes Creek
Slate Creek
Slate River
Sleepy Creek
Smith Creek
Smith River
Snake Creek
Snow Creek
Somerton Creek
South Anna River
Stave Run
South Branch Potomac River
South Buffalo Creek
South Fork Catoctin Creek
South Fork Clinch River
South Fork Elizabeth River
South Fork Falling River
South Fork Holston River
South Fork Powell River
South Fork Rivanna River
South Fork Roanoke River
South Fork Shenandoah River
South Fork South Branch Potomac River
South Fork Tye River
South Mayo River
South Meherrin River
South River (Mattaponi River tributary)
South River (Maury River tributary)
South River (Rapidan River tributary)
South River (Shenandoah River tributary)
South Yeocomico River
Southern Branch Elizabeth River
Staunton River (Rapidan River tributary)
Staunton River (or Roanoke River)
Stewarts Creek
Stinking River
Stock Creek
Stony Creek (North Fork Shenandoah River tributary)
Stony Creek (Nottoway River tributary)
Straightstone Creek
Stuart Run
Sugarland Run
Sun Run (Ararat River tributary)
Swift Creek
Ta River
Taylors Creek
Tear Wallet Creek
Terrell Branch
Thompson Creek (Ararat River tributary)
Thornton River
Three Creek
Tinker Creek
Totuskey Creek
Tug Fork
Tye River
Upper Chippokes Creek
Upper Machodoc Creek
Urbanna Creek
Walker Creek
Wallen Creek
Wards Creek
Ware River
Warwick River
West Fork Little River
West Little Seneca Creek
West Yeocomico River
Western Branch Elizabeth River
Whetstone Creek (Little Nottoway River tributary)
Whistle Creek
Whitetop Laurel Creek
Willis River
Wilson Creek
Wolf Creek
Yeocomico River
York River

See also

 List of rivers of the United States
 List of Chesapeake Bay rivers

References
USGS Geographic Names Information Service
USGS Hydrologic Unit Map – State of Virginia (1974)

 
Virginia rivers
Rivers